Ewart Morrison (7 October 1899 – 12 May 1985) was an English cricketer. He played for Gloucestershire between 1926 and 1933.

References

External links

1899 births
1985 deaths
English cricketers
Gloucestershire cricketers
People from Central Province, Sri Lanka